Maurício Osmar Rodrigues Britto (born 22 June 1991) is a Brazilian footballer who plays as a forward.

Career
On 28 August 2019 Al Hidd SC from Bahrain confirmed the signing of Maurício on their Instagram page.

Career statistics

Club

Notes

References

External links
Maurício Britto at MFA

1991 births
Living people
Brazilian footballers
Brazilian expatriate footballers
Association football forwards
Avaí FC players
Bangu Atlético Clube players
Żebbuġ Rangers F.C. players
Al-Najma SC (Bahrain) players
Hidd SCC players
Maltese Premier League players
Bahraini Premier League players
Maltese Challenge League players
Brazilian expatriate sportspeople in Malta
Expatriate footballers in Malta
Brazilian expatriate sportspeople in Kuwait
Expatriate footballers in Kuwait
Brazilian expatriate sportspeople in Bahrain
Expatriate footballers in Bahrain
Al-Yarmouk SC (Kuwait) players
Kuwait Premier League players
Footballers from Porto Alegre